The 2002–03 international cricket season was from September 2002 to April 2003.

Season overview

September

ICC Champions Trophy

October

Australia vs Pakistan in Sri Lanka & United Arab Emirates

Bangladesh in South Africa

West Indies in India

November

England in Australia

Pakistan in Zimbabwe

Sri Lanka in South Africa

West Indies in Bangladesh

December

Pakistan in South Africa

Kenya in Zimbabwe

India in New Zealand

VB Series

February

ICC Cricket World Cup

April

Cherry Blossom Sharjah Cup

References

External links
2002/03 season on ESPN Cricinfo

2003 in cricket
2002 in cricket